Marko Brainović (17 July 1920 – 16 October 2010) was a Croat water polo player who competed for Yugoslavia in the 1948 Summer Olympics and in the 1952 Summer Olympics. He was part of the Yugoslav team that was eliminated in the second round of the 1948 Olympic tournament. He played two matches. Four years later he won the silver medal with the Yugoslav team in the 1952 tournament. He played three matches.

See also
 List of Olympic medalists in water polo (men)

References

Mention of Zdravko-Ćiro Kovačić as the last Yugoslavian water polo player from 1948

External links
 

1920 births
2010 deaths
Water polo players from Split, Croatia
Croatian male water polo players
Yugoslav male water polo players
Olympic water polo players of Yugoslavia
Water polo players at the 1948 Summer Olympics
Water polo players at the 1952 Summer Olympics
Olympic silver medalists for Yugoslavia
Olympic medalists in water polo
Medalists at the 1952 Summer Olympics
Burials at Lovrinac Cemetery